Josie Tomkow (born October 15, 1995) is a Republican member of the Florida Legislature representing the state's 39th House district, which includes parts of Osceola and Polk counties.

Florida House of Representatives
Tomkow defeated Jennifer Spath in a special Republican primary for the vacant 39th House district seat on February 20, 2018. Tomkow then won the May 1, 2018 special election, defeating Democrat Ricky Shirah with 59.9% of the vote. At the time of her election to the House, Tomkow was 22 years old.

Tomkow again defeated Shirah by a similar margin in the November 6, 2018 general election.

Based on a review of 2018 traffic citations, questions have been raised whether Tomkow meets residency requirements to hold her seat.

References

Republican Party members of the Florida House of Representatives
Living people
21st-century American politicians
University of Florida alumni
1995 births
Women state legislators in Florida
21st-century American women politicians